Manhattan is a coastal town in the South Bay region of Los Angeles, California.

Geography
Manhattan is bordered to the north by El Segundo, and to the south by Hermosa. To the east lies the city of Torrance. No freeways directly serve Manhattan, though the 405 Freeway is not too far east. The closest major cities are Century City and Los Angeles, and Los Angeles International Airport is about three miles north of the town.

Topographically, Manhattan is relatively flat, except the immediate coastal region which consists of a stepper ridge leading to the beach.

Demographics
Manhattan is among the wealthiest communities in Southern California, and is comparable to Beverly Hills and Newport Beach in its household income and relatively conservative population. Over 90% of the population identifies as White, among the highest rates in Southern California. Historically, the town has primarily consisted of families with children, but is now increasingly being composed of recent college graduates, attracted to the job opportunities here and in nearby cities like Santa Monica and Redondo.

References

South Bay, Los Angeles